Barton Regis may refer to:

 Barton Regis Hundred, an ancient subdivision of Gloucestershire, England
 Barton Regis Rural District, a local government unit in Gloucestershire from 1894 to 1904